Ramón de Mendizábal Amezaga (5 November 1914 – 11 February 1938), known as Mendizábal in his playing days, was a Spanish footballer who played as a right winger.

Club career
He was a prominent player in the 1930s. In the 1933–34 season won promotion to the second level with Hércules CF. In the 1935–36 season was uncovered as much right wing player in Hércules, in the top flight. Mendizábal served with the Nationalists during the Spanish Civil War and died in a plane crash in 1938.

References

External links
 

1914 births
1938 deaths
People from Santurtzi
Spanish footballers
Footballers from the Basque Country (autonomous community)
Association football wingers
La Liga players
Tercera División players
Real Madrid CF players
Atlético Madrid footballers
Hércules CF players
Military personnel killed in the Spanish Civil War
Sportspeople from Biscay
Spanish military personnel of the Spanish Civil War (National faction)